The Midwest League Manager of the Year Award is an annual award given to the best manager in Minor League Baseball's Midwest League based on their regular-season performance as voted on by league managers. Broadcasters, Minor League Baseball executives, and members of the media have previously voted as well. The award was created in the league's inaugural 1947 season. The circuit was known as the Illinois State League from 1947 to 1948 and as the Mississippi–Ohio Valley League from 1949 to 1955 before becoming the Midwest League in 1956. After the cancellation of the 2020 season, the league was known as the High-A Central in 2021 before reverting to the Midwest League name in 2022.

The only manager to win the award on three occasions is Mark Haley, who won in 2005, 2008, and 2013. Three others have each won twice: Bruce Fields, Gomer Hodge, and Buddy Kerr.

Six managers from the Wisconsin Timber Rattlers have been selected for the Manager of the Year Award, more than any other team in the league, followed by the Cedar Rapids Kernels, Kane County Cougars, Waterloo Indians, and West Michigan Whitecaps (5); the Quad Cities River Bandits and South Bend Cubs (4); the Burlington Bees, Danville Warriors, and Great Lakes Loons (3); the Clinton Giants, Kenosha Twins, Lansing Lugnuts, Michigan Battle Cats, Peoria Chiefs, and Wisconsin Rapids Twins (2); and the Belleville Stags, Beloit Sky Carp, Bowling Green Hot Rods, Decatur Commodores, Fort Wayne TinCaps, Lafayette Red Sox, Madison Muskies, Michigan City White Caps, Quincy Giants, Rockford Royals, Springfield Cardinals, and Wausau Timbers (1).

Six managers from the Detroit Tigers Major League Baseball (MLB) organization have won the award, more than any other, followed by the Chicago White Sox and Oakland Athletics organizations (5); the Boston Red Sox, Chicago Cubs, Milwaukee Brewers, Minnesota Twins, and San Francisco Giants organizations (4); the Arizona Diamondbacks, Cleveland Guardians, Kansas City Royals, Los Angeles Dodgers, and St. Louis Cardinals organizations (3); the Baltimore Orioles, Cincinnati Reds, Los Angeles Angels, Houston Astros, Miami Marlins, and Toronto Blue Jays organizations (2); and the San Diego Padres and Tampa Bay Rays organizations (1). Two award winners played for teams that operated as cooperatives of several MLB organizations.

Winners

Wins by team

Active Midwest League teams appear in bold.

Wins by organization

Active Midwest League–Major League Baseball affiliations appear in bold.

Notes

References
Specific

General

Awards established in 1947
Manager
Minor league baseball coaching awards